The B.J. Ricker House is a historic dwelling located in Grinnell, Iowa, United States.  The significance of this house is that it is an early example of Walter Burley Griffin's work.  Construction on the house began in 1911, but millwork and labor problems pushed its completion to 1912.  The two-story brick house features a rectangular plan, a high cement basement, four broad brick piers on the corners, and a gable roof that appears to hover over the main block.  The veranda on the south side of the house follows a Greek cross plan.  The house was listed on the National Register of Historic Places in 1979.

References

Houses completed in 1912
Grinnell, Iowa
Houses in Poweshiek County, Iowa
Houses on the National Register of Historic Places in Iowa
National Register of Historic Places in Poweshiek County, Iowa
Prairie School architecture in Iowa
Walter Burley Griffin buildings